The 2022 Volta ao Algarve (English: Tour of the Algarve) was a road cycling stage race that took place between 16 and 20 February 2022 in the Algarve region of southern Portugal. The race was rated as a category 2.Pro event on the 2022 UCI ProSeries calendar, and was the 48th edition of the Volta ao Algarve.

After the 2021 edition was postponed to May due to a rising number of COVID-19 cases in Portugal, the race returned to its traditional mid-February timeslot.

Teams 
10 of the 18 UCI WorldTeams, five UCI ProTeams, and ten UCI Continental teams made up the 25 teams that participated in the race. In total, 165 riders started the race, of which 133 finished.

UCI WorldTeams

 
 
 
 
 
 
 
 
 
 

UCI ProTeams

 
 
 
 
 

UCI Continental Teams

 
 
 
 Efapel Cycling

Route

Stages

Stage 1 
16 February 2022 – Portimão to Lagos,

Stage 2 
17 February 2022 – Albufeira to Alto da Fóia (Monchique),

Stage 3 
18 February 2022 – Almodôvar to Faro,

Stage 4 
19 February 2022 – Vila Real de Santo António to Tavira,  (ITT)

Stage 5 
20 February 2022 – Lagoa to Alto do Malhão (Loulé),

Classification leadership table 

 On stage 2, Bryan Coquard, who was second in the points classification, wore the green jersey, because first-placed Fabio Jakobsen wore the yellow jersey as the leader of the general classification.
 On stage 3, João Matias, who was second in the mountains classification, wore the blue jersey, because first-placed David Gaudu wore the yellow jersey as the leader of the general classification.
 On stage 5, Johannes Staune-Mittet, who was second in the young rider classification, wore the white jersey, because first-placed Remco Evenepoel wore the yellow jersey as the leader of the general classification.

Final classification standings

General classification

Points classification

Mountains classification

Young rider classification

Team classification

References

Sources

External links 
 

2022
Volta ao Algarve
Volta ao Algarve
Volta ao Algarve